Estonia participated at the 2017 Summer Universiade in Taipei, Taiwan, from 19 to 30 August 2017.

Medal summary

Team

References 

Estonia at the Summer Universiade
2017 in Estonian sport
Nations at the 2017 Summer Universiade